Villupuram district, India has several primary, secondary and tertiary educational institutions.

Different schools in Villupuram follow the curricula set by their board of choice, such as the Tamil Nadu State Board or the CBSE.

Colleges in Villupuram District 
At tertiary level, the range of colleges in Viluppuram varies from Arts and Science Colleges (both Government and privately run) to professional colleges for Engineering and Medical Studies.kuralamudhu ias from Villupuram.

Around half a dozen Engineering Colleges have mushroomed in the recent years, thanks to IT and fancy investment in education. The Quality of education in these institutions are below par with the exception of a couple of colleges started in late 1990s and early 2000. Almost all the Engineering Colleges are under Anna University and affiliated to AICTE. The notable and famous one is Sri Aravindar Engineering College located in Vanur Taluk.

In 2010, Government Villupuram medical college was started functioning at Mundiyampakkam (8 km away from Villupuram on the way to Chennai) with full fletched hospital.

Engineering 
 IFET College of Engineering, An Autonomous Institution, Villupuram
 Mailam Engineering College, Mailam

Schools 

 The Claribel Matric school, Villupuram
Sacred Heart Anglo-Indian Higher Secondary School, Villupuram
Railway Mixed High School
Ramakrishna Mission Vidyalaya Matric Higher Secondary School
E.S. Lords International School

Viluppuram
Education in Viluppuram district